The discography of Hanson, an American pop rock band. They are best known for the 1997 hit song "MMMBop" from their major label debut album Middle of Nowhere, which earned three Grammy nominations. Despite the enormous commercial success of Middle of Nowhere, the band suffered from the merger that eliminated their label, Mercury Records.

The group was moved to Island Def Jam Music Group, which they eventually left after conflict with the label about creative input. Hanson has sold over 16 million records worldwide and have had 8 top 40 albums and 3 top 40 singles in the US, as well as 8 top 40 singles in the UK. The band now records under its own label, 3CG Records.

Albums

Studio albums

Live albums

Demo albums

Compilation albums

Extended plays
In June 2020, with the relaunch of the hanson.net website, official names were given to most of the 2003-2010 EPs that were previously only known by the year or website version they were released under. Those names are notated below.

Singles

As main artist

As featured artist

Promotional singles

Notes

References

Discographies of American artists
Pop music group discographies
Discography